Huimbayoc or Wimpayuq (Quechua) is one of fourteen districts of the province San Martín in Peru. 

Part of the district is located in the Cordillera Azul National Park.

References